Burton Williams (August 30, 1908 – February 9, 1981) was an American ice hockey defenseman who played three seasons in the National Hockey League (NHL) for the Detroit Red Wings, the St. Louis Eagles and the Boston Bruins between 1933 and 1935. He was born in Okemah, Oklahoma, but grew up in Duluth, Minnesota. The rest of his career, which lasted from 1927 to 1941, was spent in the minor league American Hockey Association, International Hockey League, and International American Hockey League. He died at a Duluth, Minnesota hospital in 1981.

Career statistics

Regular season and playoffs

References

External links

1908 births
1981 deaths
American men's ice hockey defensemen
Boston Bruins players
Detroit Olympics (IHL) players
Detroit Red Wings players
Duluth Hornets players
Ice hockey people from Minnesota
Kansas City Americans players
Minneapolis Millers (AHA) players
New Haven Eagles players
Omaha Knights (AHA) players
People from Duluth, Minnesota
Pittsburgh Hornets players
St. Louis Eagles players
St. Louis Flyers players
Tulsa Oilers (AHA) players
Wichita Blue Jays players